Saint-Gilles (Gallo: Saent-Jill) is a commune in the Ille-et-Vilaine department in Brittany in northwestern France.

Population
Inhabitants of Saint-Gilles are called saint-gillois in French.

See also
Communes of the Ille-et-Vilaine department
Emmanuel Guérin Sculptor of  Saint-Gilles, Ille-et-Vilaine  war memorial

References

External links

Official website 

Mayors of Ille-et-Vilaine Association 

Communes of Ille-et-Vilaine